Gracián Babán (c. 1620 – February 2, 1675) was a Valencian musician and composer.

He was musical director in the Cathedral of Valencia from 1657 to 1675. Over forty of his masses and motets, written for several choirs, are preserved at Valencia. His setting of Psalm 142 (Voce mea ad Dominum) was included in Hilarión Eslava's collection  (1869).

Notes

External links
 

Composers from the Valencian Community
1620s births
1675 deaths